Lower Laithe Reservoir is a man-made upland reservoir that lies  west of Haworth, West Yorkshire, England. The reservoir was initially approved under the Keighley Waterworks and Improvement Act of 1869 but work did not begin on its construction until 1911 and even then was delayed because of the First World War. The reservoir was officially opened in August 1925 in front of a crowd of over 8,000 people. Its final tally on cost was £500,000. The reservoir lies in the Sladen Valley and was often referred to as Sladen Valley Reservoir.

The reservoir, alongside other nearby man-made bodies of water, was proposed to afford a better water supply to the town of Keighley and its environs.

The reservoir dams Sladen Beck watercourse and takes water directly from the surrounding moorland including the stream that flows over the Bronte Waterfall.

The road (since known as Waterhead Lane) used to cut across Sladen valley taking a north west route from Intake Farm and going through the small hamlet of Smith Bank. The hamlet and its mill (which featured in Halliwell Sutcliffe's novel A Man of the Moors) were flooded when the reservoir was completed with the road being diverted northwards onto the dam head. The dam head is concrete with a clay puddle core. There is a spillway at the northern end which drops down to the adjoining waterworks facility.

A narrow gauge railway was used to transfer the quarried product to the dam head which was operated by a rope worked incline.

The spillway and embankment were modernized and improved as part of a £60 million programme of investment by Yorkshire Water. Lower Laithe specifically was found to not have been up to standards as laid down by an act of parliament in 1978. The water classification is listed as moderate in terms of ecology and good in terms of chemical quality as of 2015. Whilst the surrounding moorland is noted for its bird life, few birds live on the reservoir itself although some like the shelduck are frequent visitors.

Sladen Beck joins the River Worth  further east near to the hamlet of Lumb Foot.

The grassed east facing slope of the dam head was used as a backdrop for a banner promoting the Tour de Yorkshire. The banner was unveiled in January 2014 as part of a wider 'Yorkshire Festival' by the owners of the reservoir and one of the sponsors of the festival, Yorkshire Water.

References

Bibliography

External links 

Reservoirs in West Yorkshire
Geography of the City of Bradford